The Apple ColorSync/AppleVision 750 Display is a 17″ (16.1″ viewable) Trinitron aperture grille CRT that was manufactured by Apple Inc. from August 5, 1997, until approximately November 10, 1998.  The video cable uses a standard Macintosh DA-15 video connector and the maximum resolution is 1280×1024.

The display also has an ADB port (not S-video despite the identical plug).  Connecting the display via ADB to a Macintosh running MacOS 9 and below allows extensive display adjustment and calibration in software, using the Monitors or Monitors & Sound control panel.  As this control panel was never ported to OS X, these monitors can only be used at the default VGA resolution in OS X, or indeed in any other OS.

There are 2 further ADB ports located on the sides of the display that can be used to attach additional ADB devices.

References 
 EveryMac.com

Apple Inc. peripherals
Apple Inc. displays